The PLANETS telescope (Polarized Light from Atmospheres of Nearby ExtraTerrestrial Systems) is a precursor and technology demonstrator for the Colossus Telescope. It is a single off-axis 1.85 meter telescope, currently under development with 2.6m USD already invested, funded by Tohoku University (Japan), the Institute for Astronomy (Hawaii), the Kiepenheuer Institute (Germany), and National Autonomous University of Mexico. First light was expected in January 2018, and the telescope's proposed location was Haleakalā, a 3000m (10,000ft) volcano on the island of Maui, Hawaii.

See also
 Colossus Telescope

External links
 PLANETS Foundation

References 

Telescopes under construction
Optical telescopes